Route 136 is a  numbered state highway in the U.S. state of Rhode Island. Its southern terminus is at Route 114 in Bristol, and its northern terminus is at the Massachusetts border where it continues as Massachusetts Route 136.

Route description

Route 136 takes the following route through the State:

 Bristol: ; Route 114 to Warren town line
 Metacom Avenue
 Warren: ; Bristol town line to Massachusetts state line at Route 136
 Metacom Avenue, Kickemuit Avenue, Arlington Avenue, and Market Street

Major intersections

See also

References

External links

 2019 Highway Map, Rhode Island

136
Transportation in Bristol County, Rhode Island